15 Minuten Wahrheit is a German film directed by Nico Zingelmann and starring Herbert Knaup and Christoph Bach.

Plot
The 50-year-old Georg Komann and his colleagues at Jaffcorp Investment AG are completely unexpectedly dismissed from their employer without adequate compensation. They are facing a personal end because they know that no one is hiring new people over 50. Komann forges a risky plan with which he could secure the future for himself and his friends. He puts everything on one card and asks his boss Sebastian Berg for a conversation, one that could change his life - in any direction - a conversation of 15 minutes.

Berg offers Komann a severance payment, which he refuses because he is apparently the only one who is to be lavishly rewarded. He wants to stand up for the employees and demands severance payments for all those who are to be laid off, as many are over 50 and no longer have a chance to get a new job. Berg leaves that cold. During the conversation, Komann said that he knew that the company had a secret bank account in Switzerland and that a lot of money had been stashed away. With the knowledge he wants to put his young boss under pressure and threatens to go public. Berg does not agree to this because he believes that Komann has no evidence. Komann tells his boss that this was only used by the management to open the account. Thus, the board is above suspicion and Berg is the bogeyman. Komann claims that he and his employees have already cleared the secret account. Berg doesn't think so. He has a notebook with the TAN numbers on his desk so that he can carry out transactions. Komann says that he can't memorize anything either, whereupon Berg believes that Komann secretly stole the notebook and photocopied it. In fact, Komann pulls copies out of his jacket pocket. Since the TAN numbers are only valid once, Berg does not worry and secretly calls the security service via live mail. When Komann leaves the office, Berg has him arrested by the security guard.

Berg now calls the bank in Zurich to see if there have been any transactions in the last 24 hours. The alleged employee on the phone says no. Berg then goes into the anteroom, where Komann is in handcuffs, and says with a grin that he almost had him. Komann thinks that the attempt was worth it. Berg sees Komann as a traitor. He had abused the trust when he was caught stealing confidential documents. He gambled everything away and no one would hire him anymore. At Berg's instructions, the security guard reaches into Komann's jacket pocket and pulls out the alleged copy of the TAN numbers, which, to Berg's horror, turns out to be a menu card. In the presence of the security guard, however, he pretends that this is really a copy of the TAN numbers and alleges that Komann is spying. In addition, by the time Komann unpacks, all evidence would have been removed. Berg cuts his severance payment because traitors would get nothing.

Then he has Komann taken away by the security service. This should hand him over to the police. Berg goes back to the office. As soon as he is sitting at his desk, he receives a live mail sent by his secretary in the anteroom. A video opens, recorded by the surveillance camera in the anteroom. The entire conversation was recorded. The video also shows that Berg did not speak to the bank in Zurich, but first to the secretary, who disguise her voice, and then to a Jaffcorp employee who also spoke in a Swiss accent. The conversation was deliberately diverted by the secretary.

Shortly afterwards, Berg received a voice mail from Komann; the whole thing was planned by the employees in order to get to the transaction number that Berg gave on the phone. The employee who posed as a Swiss banker on the phone wrote down this transaction number and called the bank in Switzerland to complete a transaction. Now the employees have the money. Berg then calls the security guard and has Komann released. Komann explains on the voice mail that Berg will get the money back, minus a reasonable compensation for the employees. Only then would they keep the secret. He assures him that he will have a long and prosperous future at Jaffcorp and that he will find a way to discreetly balance everything. Berg is angry and kicks over the chair in his office on which Komann was just sitting. Komann, the secretary and the colleague who pretended to be Swiss leave the company and hand in their IDs to the porter. The latter gives Komann a recording device. On the tape you can hear the voice mail that the porter sent to Berg as a recording. He also recorded the conversation in the anteroom.

Cast
 Herbert Knaup as Georg Komann
 Christoph Bach as Sebastian Berg

References

External links
 

German short films
2000s German-language films
2007 films
2000s German films